Keith Robinson is an American environmentalist who is the co-owner of Niʻihau, the second-smallest of the eight principal Hawaiian Islands.

Life
Robinson was born c. 1941 to Lester Beauclerk Robinson (1901–1969) and Helen Matthew Robinson (1910–2002).
He attended the University of California, Davis, graduating with a degree in agronomy and ranch management. After college, he served in the US Army before returning to Hawaii, where he initially worked at the Koolau Ranch on Kauaʻi seven years and then operated a commercial fishing vessel on Kauaʻi for another seven years.

Robinson and his brother Bruce own the approximately  island of Niʻihau in the Hawaiian island chain, which has been in the private possession of their family since their great-great-grandmother Elizabeth McHutchinson Sinclair (1800–1892) purchased it from King Kamehameha V for US$10,000 in gold. He is also the manager of a private botanical garden on the Hawaiian island of Kauaʻi. Robinson makes his home on Kauaʻi, but visits Niʻihau at least once per week on average.

Conservation work on Niʻihau
Robinson has been credited for keeping numerous Hawaiian plants from becoming extinct, including Cyanea pinnatifida, which is considered extinct in the wild.

Contemporary activities
Robinson has repeatedly expressed his desire to keep Niʻihau privately owned so as to preserve the environment and traditions of its 150 to 200 native Hawaiian inhabitants, and has occasionally taken large financial losses to do so. As under their predecessors, the Robinsons have kept Niʻihau largely closed to outside visitors, though a few hunters and other tourists are admitted each year—but with limited or no contact with the islanders. The Robinsons continue to ban radios, televisions and mobile phones on the island, in an effort to preserve as much of the indigenous island culture as possible. In 1997, Robinson estimated that between $8–9 million was spent to keep people employed, not counting the free housing and free meat provided to the 150–200 Niʻihau islanders. After 135 years of operation, the ranch on the island shut down in 1999, rendering all its inhabitants unemployed.

Robinson expressed concerns about his family's ability to continue to maintain their ownership of Niʻihau, due to pressure from the federal and state governments and environmental groups. Taxes on the island have taken much of the profits from the Robinsons' interests in agricultural companies.

In 2005 a documentary on him was released titled Robinson Crusader.

Family tree

References

External links
 

1940s births
Living people
American environmentalists
American landowners
Niihau
People from Hawaii
People from Niihau
University of California, Davis alumni